Feroze Gandhi (born Feroze Jehangir Ghandy;
12 September 1912 – 8 September 1960) was an Indian freedom fighter, politician and journalist.

Gandhi published the newspapers The National Herald and The Navjivan. He served as a member of the provincial parliament between 1950 and 1952, and later a member of the Lok Sabha, the Lower House of India's parliament.

Gandhi's wife, Indira Nehru (daughter of Jawaharlal Nehru, the first Prime Minister of India), and their elder son Rajiv were both prime ministers of India.

Early life
Feroze Jehangir Ghandy was born on 12 September 1912 to a Parsi family at the Tehmulji Nariman Hospital in the Fort district of Bombay; his parents, Jehangir Faredoon Ghandy and Ratimai (née Commissariat), lived in Nauroji Natakwala Bhawan in Khetwadi Mohalla in Bombay. His father Jahangir was a marine engineer working for Killick Nixon and was later promoted as a warrant engineer. Feroze was the youngest of the five children with two brothers Dorab and Faridun Jehangir, and two sisters, Tehmina Kershashp and Aloo Dastur. The family had migrated to Bombay from Bharuch (now in South Gujarat) where their ancestral home, which belonged to his grandfather, still exists in Kotpariwad.

In the early 1920s, after the death of his father, Feroze and his mother moved to Allahabad to live with his unmarried maternal aunt, Shirin Commissariat, a surgeon at the city's Lady Dufferin Hospital. He attended the Vidya Mandir High School and then graduated from the British-staffed Ewing Christian College.

Family and career
In 1930, the wing of Congress Freedom fighters, the Vanar Sena was formed. Feroze met Kamala Nehru and Indira among the women demonstrators picketing outside Ewing Christian College. Kamala fainted with the heat of the sun and Feroze went to comfort her. The next day, he abandoned his studies to join the Indian independence movement. Being inspired by Mahatma Gandhi, Feroze changed the spelling of his surname from "Ghandy" to "Gandhi" after joining the Independence movement. He was imprisoned in 1930, along with Lal Bahadur Shastri (the 2nd Prime Minister of India), head of Allahabad District Congress Committee, and lodged in Faizabad Jail for nineteen months. Soon after his release, he was involved with the agrarian no-rent campaign in the United Province (now Uttar Pradesh) and was imprisoned twice, in 1932 and 1933, while working closely with Nehru.

Feroze first proposed to Indira in 1933, but she and her mother rejected it, putting forward that she was too young, only 16. He grew close to the Nehru family, especially to Indira's mother Kamala Nehru, accompanying her to the TB sanatorium at Bhowali in 1934, helping arrange her trip to Europe when her condition worsened in April 1935, and visiting her at the sanitarium at Badenweiler and finally at Lausanne, where he was at her bedside when she died on 28 February 1936. In the following years, Indira and Feroze grew closer to each other while in England. They married in March 1942 according to Hindu rituals.

Indira's father Jawaharlal Nehru opposed her marriage and approached Mahatma Gandhi to dissuade the young couple, but to no avail. The couple were arrested and jailed in August 1942, during the Quit India Movement less than six months after their marriage. He was imprisoned for a year in Allahabad's Naini Central Prison. The following five years were of comfortable domestic life and the couple had two sons, Rajiv and Sanjay, born in 1944 and 1946, respectively.

After independence, Jawaharlal became the first Prime Minister of India. Feroze and Indira settled in Allahabad with their two young children, and Feroze became Managing Director of The National Herald, a newspaper founded by his father-in-law.

After being a member of the provincial parliament (1950–1952), Feroze won independent India's first general elections in 1952, from Rae Bareli constituency in Uttar Pradesh. Indira came down from Delhi and worked as his campaign organizer. Feroze soon became a prominent force in his own right, criticizing the government of his father-in-law and beginning a fight against corruption.

In the years after independence, many Indian business houses had become close to the political leaders, and some of them started various financial irregularities.  In a case exposed by Feroze in December 1955, he revealed how Ram Kishan Dalmia, as chairman of a bank and an insurance company, used these companies to fund his takeover of Bennett and Coleman
and started transferring money illegally from publicly held companies for personal benefit.

In 1957, he was re-elected from Rae Bareli. In the parliament in 1958, he raised the Haridas Mundhra scandal involving the government controlled LIC insurance company. This was a huge embarrassment to the clean image of Nehru's government and eventually led to the resignation of the Finance Minister T.T. Krishnamachari. His rift with Indira had also become public knowledge by then, and added to the media interest in the matter.

Feroze also initiated a number of nationalization drives, starting with the Life Insurance Corporation. At one point he also suggested that TATA Engineering and Locomotive Company (TELCO) be nationalized since they were charging nearly double the price of a Japanese railway engine.  This raised a stir in the Parsi community since the Tatas were also Parsi.  He continued challenging the government on a number of other issues, and emerged as a parliamentarian well-respected on both sides of the bench.

Death and legacy
Feroze suffered a heart attack in 1958. Indira, who stayed with her father at Teen Murti House, the official residence of the prime minister, was at that time away on a state visit to Bhutan. She returned to look after him in Kashmir. Feroze died in 1960 at the Willingdon Hospital, Delhi, after suffering a second heart attack. He was cremated and his ashes interred at the Parsi cemetery in Allahabad.

His Rae Bareli Lok Sabha constituency seat was held by his daughter-in-law, and wife of Rajiv Gandhi, Sonia Gandhi in 2004, 2009, 2014 and 2019.

A school of higher education that he helped found was named after him in Rae Bareli.

NTPC Limited renamed their Unchahar Thermal Power Station in Uttar Pradesh to Feroze Gandhi Unchahar Thermal Power Plant.

Notes

References

Sources
 
 

1912 births
1960 deaths
Parsi people
Parsi people from Mumbai
Indian newspaper editors
Indian male journalists
Nehru–Gandhi family
Indian Zoroastrians
Politicians from Allahabad
India MPs 1952–1957
India MPs 1957–1962
Indian National Congress politicians
Indian independence activists from Maharashtra
Prisoners and detainees of British India
Members of the Constituent Assembly of India
Spouses of prime ministers of India
Politicians from Mumbai
Lok Sabha members from Uttar Pradesh
20th-century Indian journalists
Writers from Mumbai
Journalists from Maharashtra
Journalists from Gujarat
Writers from Allahabad
Husbands of national leaders